The International Union of Radio Science (abbreviated URSI, after its French name) is one of 26 international scientific unions affiliated to the International Council for Science (ICSU).

History and objectives 

URSI was officially created in 1919, during the Constitutive Assembly of the International Research Council (now ICSU), based on the earlier  (1913–1914) when the only radio communication system was radiotelegraphy. It has held a general assembly every three years from 1922. Fifty years ago URSI was one of the most important promoters of the International Geophysical Year. It co-sponsors the Radio Science journal (co-sponsored by the American Geophysical Union) as well as the Journal of Atmospheric and Solar-Terrestrial Physics.

URSI's original objective (to encourage "scientific studies of radiotelegraphy, especially those which require international cooperation") has been broadened to include all radio science, from telecommunications to radio astronomy, acquisition of radar information about distant passive objects, studies of the radiation stimulated or spontaneously emitted by these objects, biological effects of electromagnetic radiation and active modification of objects by radio waves, within the spectrum from extremely low frequency to the optical domain.

Commissions 

 Commission A: Electromagnetic Metrology
 Commission B: Fields and Waves
 Commission C: Radiocommunication Systems and Signal Processing
 Commission D: Electronics and Photonics
 Commission E: Electromagnetic Environment and Interference
 Commission F: Wave Propagation and Remote Sensing
 Commission G: Ionospheric Radio and Propagation
 Commission H: Waves in Plasmas
 Commission J: Radio Astronomy
 Commission K: Electromagnetics in Biology and Medicine

A few Commissions are engaged with international projects in cooperation with other international bodies, for example with the Committee on Space Research in the project International Reference Ionosphere.

Individual Membership 

The URSI includes different individual membership grades: 
Corresponding member (CURSI)
Senior member, awarded to members who have a PhD, 10+ publications, and a history of involvement with the URSI
Fellow, by invitation or by winning a URSI senior prize

See also
 Radio science#URSI

References

External links

 United States National Committee of the International Union of Radio Science

Ghent University
Members of the International Council for Science
Organisations based in East Flanders
Radio organizations
Scientific organizations
Scientific organisations based in Belgium
Scientific organizations established in 1919
Members of the International Science Council